Andreas Karl Johnsson (born 21 November 1994) is a Swedish professional ice hockey winger for the  San Jose Sharks of the National Hockey League (NHL). Johnsson was selected by the Toronto Maple Leafs in the seventh round, 202nd overall, of the 2013 NHL Entry Draft.

Early life
Johnsson was born on 21 November 1994 in Gävle. He is the youngest son of former ice hockey player Jonas Johnson. Andreas' older brother Jonathan is also an ice hockey player, who plays for Skellefteå AIK.

Playing career

Sweden
Johnsson made his Elitserien debut for Frölunda HC on 18 December 2012 in a home game against AIK IF. In his second game, on December 26 at Rögle BK, Johnsson scored his first career Elitserien goal, the game-winning goal in the shootout.

On 21 April 2014, Johnsson was named the SHL Rookie of the Year, beating out Frölunda teammates Alexander Wennberg and fellow Maple Leafs prospect Tom Nilsson, as well as HV71's Kevin Fiala.

During the 2014–15 season, Johnsson led Frölunda in goals with 22, also contributing 13 assists for 35 points from 55 regular season games played. On 4 June 2015, the Maple Leafs signed Johnsson to a three-year, entry-level contract.

NHL

Toronto Maple Leafs
The following season was another sensational year for Johnsson, in which he finished sixth in league scoring and helped Frölunda capture their fourth championship. Having stated this would be his last season in Sweden and wanting to begin his North American development, Johnsson debuted for the Toronto Marlies—the Maple Leafs' American Hockey League (AHL) affiliate—shortly afterwards in order to assist their Calder Cup playoff run. However, his stint was cut short, as in his second North American game, Johnsson was hit in the head by an elbow from Albany Devils player Dan Kelly. Kelly was suspended ten games for the play and Johnsson would not play another game that season. 

During the 2017–18 season, Johnsson was named to the 2018 AHL All-Star Game as a replacement for fellow Maple Leafs prospect Kasperi Kapanen, who was called up to the NHL. On 13 March 2018, Johnsson was called up to the Maple Leafs alongside Calle Rosén. While Rosén was sent back down, Johnsson made his NHL debut on March 14 in a 6–5 win over the Dallas Stars. He recorded his first NHL goal in the following game against the Montreal Canadiens, a 4–0 victory. Johnsson recorded his first multi-point game on 2 April 2018 in a 5–2 win over the Buffalo Sabres. Near the conclusion of the 2017–18 regular season, Johnsson was selected for the AHL's Second All-Star team. Johnsson made his NHL playoff debut during the 2018 Stanley Cup playoffs against the Boston Bruins and recorded his first playoff goal on April 21 to help the Leafs win 4–3. After the Leafs were eliminated from the playoffs, Johnsson was sent down to the Marlies to help them in their 2018 Calder Cup playoff run. After leading all players in points during the playoffs, Johnsson was awarded the Jack Butterfield Trophy as MVP of the Calder Cup. As a restricted free agent entering the off-season, Johnsson accepted his qualifying offer from the Maple Leafs, signing a one-year, two-way contract worth $787,500.

Following a successful training camp, Johnsson began the 2018–19 season with the Maple Leafs in the NHL. On November 24, in a game against the Philadelphia Flyers, Johnsson scored his first career NHL hat-trick by scoring three goals in the first period to lead the Leafs to a 6–0 win.

On 28 June 2019, after scoring 20 goals and 43 points, Johnsson signed a new four-year, $13.6 million contract with the Maple Leafs worth an average annual value of $3.4 million.

New Jersey Devils
On 10 October 2020, Johnsson was traded by the Maple Leafs to the New Jersey Devils in exchange for Joey Anderson. After playing 121 games in two seasons with the Devils, Johnsson was put on waivers but went unclaimed before the 2022–23 season started and was sent to play for AHL affiliate, the Utica Comets. Johnsson later returned on recall to the NHL, featuring in two scoreless games with the Devils, before he was returned to the Comets. Through 36 games with the Comets, Johnsson was second in team scoring with nine goals and 29 points.

San Jose Sharks
On 26 February 2023, Johnsson's three-year tenure with the Devils ended after he was included in a multi-player trade to the San Jose Sharks in exchange for Timo Meier.

Career statistics

Regular season and playoffs

International

Awards and honors

References

External links

 

1994 births
Living people
Swedish expatriate ice hockey players in Canada
Frölunda HC players
New Jersey Devils players
People from Gävle
Sportspeople from Gävleborg County
San Jose Sharks players
Swedish ice hockey forwards
Toronto Maple Leafs draft picks
Toronto Maple Leafs players
Toronto Marlies players
Utica Comets players